This list of oldest companies in India includes brands and companies, excluding associations and educational, governmental, or religious organisations. To be listed, a brand or company name must remain, either in whole or in part, since inception and should have been established before 1947 and be currently operational. If the original name has since changed due to acquisitions or renaming, this must be verifiable.

The oldest company in India is the Wadia Group whose origins are traceable to 1736, with its subsidiary The Bombay Burmah Trading Corporation Limited, established in 1863, being the oldest publicly traded company in India.

List

See also 
 List of companies of India
 List of oldest banks in India
 :Category:Companies of India by year of establishment

References

 70 companies with pre-1947 roots. livemint.

Oldest companies, India
Oldest
Oldest companies
Oldest companies
Oldest companies in India
Oldest things